Circomphalus is a genus of saltwater clams, marine bivalve molluscs in the family Veneridae, the venus clams.

Fossil records
The genus Circomphalus is known from the Miocene to the Recent periods (age range: from 15.97 to 0.0 million years ago).

Species
Species within this genus, according to ITIS, include:
 Circomphalus callimorphus (Dall, 1902)
 Circomphalus casina (Linnaeus, 1758)
 Circomphalus fordi (Yates, 1890)
 Circomphalus strigillinus (Dall, 1902)

According to the World Register of Marine Species, the species are:
 Circomphalus disjectus (Perry, 1811)
 Circomphalus foliaceolamellosus (Dillwyn, 1817)
 Circomphalus hiraseanus (Kuroda, 1930)
 Circomphalus yatei (Gray, 1835)

References

Veneridae
Bivalve genera